Archips insulanus is a species of moth of the family Tortricidae. It is found in Japan.

The wingspan is 13–16 mm for males and 17–21 mm for females.

The larvae feed on Arctium lappa.

References

Moths described in 1965
Archips
Moths of Japan